Shah Abu ol Fath (Persian شاه ابوالقاسم فتح also Romanized as Shāh Abū ol Fatḩ; also known as Shāhabolfatḩ) is a village in Sahrarud Rural District, in the Central District of Fasa County, Fars Province, Iran. At the 2006 census, its population was 43, in 9 families.

References 

Populated places in Fasa County